W. J. Seeley served as the Dean of Duke University's Edmund T. Pratt Jr. School of Engineering from 1953 until 1963. He also served as chairman of the Electrical Engineering Department at Duke University. He was formerly an engineering professor at University of Pennsylvania. During World War II, he served as Director of the Naval Ordnance Laboratory. He graduated from the Polytechnic Institute of Brooklyn (now  New York University Tandon School of Engineering). The Walter J. Seeley Scholastic Award is awarded annually at Duke University to the member of the graduating class of the Edmund T. Pratt Jr. School of Engineering who has achieved the highest scholastic average in all subjects.

References

Year of birth missing
Year of death missing
Duke University faculty
Polytechnic Institute of New York University alumni
University of Pennsylvania faculty